Mapleton is an unincorporated community in Houston County, Texas. As of 2000, its population was 32. The small town was damaged by an EF2 tornado on March 21, 2022.

References

Unincorporated communities in Houston County, Texas
Unincorporated communities in Texas